Vebjørn Berg (born 1 April 1980) is a Norwegian sports shooter. He did well at several ISSF World Cups. He was also on the winning Norwegian team at the 2002 Shooting World Championship. He represented his country at the 2008 Summer Olympics and received fourth at Men's 50 metre rifle prone.

References

External links 
 
 
 

Shooters at the 2008 Summer Olympics
Olympic shooters of Norway
Norwegian male sport shooters
1980 births
Living people
21st-century Norwegian people